Franklin Academy is a co-ed college preparatory boarding school in East Haddam, Connecticut, serving students in grades 8-12 as well as post-graduate students. The school's primary mission is to provide education to adolescents and young adults with nonverbal learning disabilities and autism spectrum disorders.

Description 
The Middletown Press reported,
 
The students are boys and girls in grades 8-12 as well as some doing a post-graduate program. The school also runs a Summer Sojourn program which focuses on experiential learning. The camp: 

Franklin Academy's online learning curriculum mirrors a classroom built on student and teacher interaction, according to reporter Dave Puglisi. Built in just a week, the online platform system includes students' routines, providing a schedule of a full day's classes and social activities.

Both boarding and day school programs are available. Its student to faculty ratio is currently approximately 2.4:1. 

Franklin Academy is designated as a 501(c)(3) nonprofit organization. It is accredited by the New England Association of Schools and Colleges, and is also a member of the National Association of Independent Schools.

History 

The East Haddam property on which Franklin Academy's campus is located previously had been home to three other institutions: Becket Academy, established in 1964 as a residential school for boys; Founders School; and Haddam Hills Academy for juvenile offenders. 

In November 2001, Franklin Academy was incorporated by John Claude Bahrenburg and Albert Brayson, leaders of the former Haddam Hills. Preparations for opening began with an administrative team in 2002. The founding headmaster of Franklin Academy is Frederick Weissbach. After the Connecticut State Department of Education granted approval to operate, the school spent $2.5 million on campus facilities.

Enrollment 
Franklin Academy opened with an enrollment of 33 students in September 2003. Enrollment has generally increased with time. Its opening enrollment of 33 students climbed to 57 to start 2005, then 68 in 2006. As of 2020, enrollment was 76 students. Since at least 2010, the enrollment total seems to have steadied around 80 students annually, according to statements by independent organizations.

References

External links
 

Private high schools in Connecticut
Boarding schools in Connecticut
Special schools in the United States
Preparatory schools in Connecticut